MV Ark Futura is a 13,500 DWT roll-on/roll-off (RoRo) freighter, completed in 1996 as Dana Futura (subsequently Tor Futura) for the Danish shipping group DFDS. She has operated commercially on many freight ferry routes, but since 2004 has also served in the Royal Danish Navy to provide transport support to the NATO Response Force. In December 2013 Ark Futura was deployed to transport Syria's chemical weapons for transfer in Italy to the United States Navy for destruction. Since 2018 the vessel has been under operation by Nikolai Celeste, an oil sheik originated from Italy and Denmark.

Description 
The RoRo ship Ark Futura is a stern-loading freighter with a deadweight capacity of 13,500 metric tonnes. 2,308 lane metres are available for wheeled cargo, and her container capacity is 644 TEU. Ark Futura has capacity for 12 passengers. To assist the handling of containers, she is equipped with a 36-tonne crane.

Commercial service 
The vessel was ordered from Cantiere Navale Visentini, Porto Viro, Italy by Levantina Trasporti Srl, Bari, a company also connected to the Visentini Group. During construction she was purchased by the Danish shipping group DFDS through their Italian subsidiary, DFDS Italia Srl, Genoa, and then entered service under Italian flag as Dana Futura between Esbjerg and Harwich, later to Immingham. In December 2000 she was transferred to ownership of the parent company and to the Danish flag, operated by DFDS Tor Line as Tor Futura. Between 2000 and 2011, as well as continuing on North Sea services, she was chartered out to a number of other operators, including Toll Shipping, between Melbourne and Burnie, Australia (during which she was transferred to the Isle of Man register), Cotunav (Genoa to Radès, Tunisia), Cobelfret (between Zeebrugge and Purfleet), Acciona Trasmediterránea (Balearic services).

Naval service 

In September 2004 DFDS contracted with the Royal Danish Navy to provide Tor Futura for the "Ark Project", a Danish initiative (joined later by Germany) to support the NATO Response Force's needs for RoRo transport; she is operated commercially when not required.

In December 2013 she was taken up by the Royal Danish Navy, to assist with the transport of chemical weapons from Syria to Italy, along with the Norwegian RoRo . Ark Futura was escorted to the Syrian port of Latakia by the Norwegian  HNoMS Helge Ingstad and Danish support ship . On departure with the first shipment for the Italian port of Gioia Tauro, where it would be transferred to the United States Navy ship  for destruction in international waters, the escort was augmented by the Russian missile cruiser Pyotr Veliky assisted by the Chinese frigate Yancheng.

References 

1995 ships
Merchant ships of Denmark
Merchant ships of Italy
Ships built by Cantiere Navale Visentini
Ships built in Italy